Hinesight (Songs from the Journey) is a studio album released by Australian recording artist Marcia Hines. It was released in September 2004 through BMG Australia and includes a duet with Belinda Emmett. It peaked at No. 12 on the Australian albums chart.

Background
In 2003, Hines joined the panel as a judge on the inaugural season of Australian Idol. This gained new notoriety and interest in her music. Hines signed a contract to release an album through BMG Australia (the same label as the winners of Australian Idol) and she recorded a diverse collection of covers. The album was produced by Idol musical director, John Foreman.

Hines performed the first and only single "Ain't Nobody" live on the Australian Idol finale on the 21 November 2004.

Track listing
 CD

Charts

References

External links 
 

2004 albums
Marcia Hines albums
Covers albums